Susan McKay (born 1957) is an Irish writer, journalist and documentary filmmaker.

Biography
Born in Derry, in Northern Ireland, McKay moved to Dublin in 1975 to study at Trinity College, Dublin (TCD). In 1981, she moved to Belfast to write her PhD at The Queen's University of Belfast but instead became one of the founding members of the Belfast Rape Crisis Centre. Thereafter, she worked on a number of community development projects before becoming a full-time journalist in 1989.

McKay was social affairs correspondent, and later Northern Ireland editor, for the Sunday Tribune.  during which she won a number of awards, including Print Journalist of the Year in 2000 and Feature Writer of the Year

In 1998, she published her first book, Sophia's Story  the biography of a survivor of child abuse  Other books include  Northern Protestants – An Unsettled People, McKay has described as "a study of the people I uneasily call my own." and Bear in Mind These Dead a history of the Troubles from the perspective of those who were bereaved.

From 2009 to 2012, McKay was CEO of the National Women's Council of Ireland, but resigned in protest at a cut by the government of 40% of the organisation's funds.

She has produced award-winning documentaries for radio and television, including The Daughter's Story, about the daughters of Fran O'Toole, one of the victims of the Miami Showband Massacre in 1975, and Inez, A Challenging Woman about Northern Irish trade union leader and human rights activist Inez McCormack.

She currently writes for The Guardian/The Observer, The New York Times, The Irish Times and the London Review of Books.

Books 

 Northern Protestants: On Shifting Ground (Blackstaff Press Ltd, 2021) 
 From Belfast to Basra, and Back Again (Grosvenor House Publishing, 2013) 
 Bear in Mind These Dead (Faber & Faber, 2008) 
 Without Fear – 25 Years of the Dublin Rape Crisis Centre (New Island Books, 2005) 
 Northern Protestants – An Unsettled People (Blackstaff Press Ltd, 2000) 
 Sophia's Story (Gill & Macmillan Ltd, 1998)

External links 
Official website
Susan McKay at The Guardian
Susan McKay articles at The Irish Times

References 

Irish journalists
Writers from Derry (city)
Alumni of Trinity College Dublin
Journalists from Northern Ireland
Irish film producers
1957 births
Mass media people from Derry (city)
Living people
Irish women film producers